Bharani Pictures is a film production company in Chennai, India. It was established by P. S. Ramakrishna Rao and Bhanumathi Ramakrishna in 1947. They later established Bharani Studios in 1950. It is named after their son Bharani. Dr. Bharani Paluvai, who is presently taking care of the studios and established Bharani Hospitals in the compound. Bharani Function Hall opened April 2016 by Dr. Meenakshi Paluvai, Dr. Bharani's daughter.

Their first film Chandirani (1953), which was made in Tamil, Telugu, and Hindi languages and simultaneous released all over India.

References

Film production companies based in Chennai
Indian companies established in 1947
Mass media companies established in 1947